Chris Willis (born February 2, 1974) is an American football coach. He was recently the head football coach at the University of North Alabama. Willis was named as the 10th head football coach in North Alabama history on December 22, 2016. Willis previously served under head coaches Mark Hudspeth, Terry Bowden and Bobby Wallace with the Lions. Willis was fired midway through the 2022 season, following a 1-7 start, after over twenty years with the program.

Head coaching record

References

External links
 North Alabama profile

1974 births
Living people
American football quarterbacks
Delta State Statesmen football coaches
Delta State Statesmen football players
Itawamba Indians football players
North Alabama Lions football coaches
People from Greenville, Mississippi